Moon Shadow is the second album by American singing trio Labelle. This release was their second and last album for Warner Bros. Records. The album is notable for their soulful rendition of The Who's "Won't Get Fooled Again", the socially conscious "I Believe That I've Finally Made It Home" (a song which members Patti LaBelle, Nona Hendryx and Sarah Dash share lead vocals) and the nine-minute title track in which Patti introduces all the musicians as they do their live solos. This is the first album where member Nona Hendryx begins taking over most of the songwriting.

Track listing
All tracks written by Nona Hendryx except where noted.

Side A
 "Won't Get Fooled Again" (Pete Townshend) (4:45)
 "Sunday's News" (3:30)
 "If I Can't Have You" (3:45)
 "Ain't It Sad It's All Over" (3:30)
 "Peace With Yourself" (Sarah Dash) (2:55)

Side B
 "Moonshadow" (Cat Stevens) (9:24)
 "Touch Me All Over" (3:25)
 "I Believe That I've Finally Made It Home" (4:52)
 "People Say They're Changing" (3:20)

Personnel
Labelle
Patti LaBelle – vocals
Nona Hendryx – vocals 
Sarah Dash – vocals

Additional musicians
Kenny Ascher, Leon Pendarvis, Maxayn Lewis, Michael Powell – piano 
Andre "Mandre" Lewis – organ
Kenny Ascher, Andre "Mandre" Lewis – clavinet
David Spinozza, Marlo Henderson, Dick Frank – guitar
Chuck Rainey, Russell George – bass guitar
Kenneth "Spider Webb" Rice, Rick Marotta – drums
Maurice Saunders, Rick Marotta – congas 
Harold Vick – soprano saxophone (on #1)
Buzzy Linhart – vibraphone (4)
Larry Fallon – string arrangement (7)

References

External links
 
 Moon Shadow on Discogs.com

1972 albums
Labelle albums
Warner Records albums
Albums arranged by Larry Fallon
Albums produced by Vicki Wickham